Eizaguirre is a surname of Basque origins. Notable people with the surname include:

Agustín Eizaguirre (1897–1961), Spanish footballer
Guillermo Eizaguirre (1909–1986), Spanish football goalkeeper and manager
Ignacio Eizaguirre (1920–2013), Spanish football goalkeeper
Jose Echegaray y Eizaguirre (1832–1916), Spanish civil engineer, mathematician, statesman, and dramatist
Unai Osa Eizaguirre (born 1975), Spanish former road bicycle racer

See also
Aguirre (disambiguation)
Eyzaguirre (disambiguation)
Izaguirre

Basque-language surnames